John Selden Roane (January 8, 1817April 7, 1867) was an American politician and lawyer who served as the fourth Governor of Arkansas from 1849 to 1852. Prior to this he commanded the Arkansas Mounted Infantry Regiment following the death of Colonel Archibald Yell at the Battle of Buena Vista. Roane also served as a senior officer of the Confederate States Army who commanded infantry in the Trans-Mississippi Theater of the American Civil War.

Early life and career
John Selden Roane was born in Wilson County, Tennessee, and educated at Cumberland College, which at the time was located in Princeton, Kentucky. He migrated to the new state of Arkansas in 1837, studied law, and was admitted to the bar. He was Prosecuting Attorney for the 2nd Judicial District of Arkansas from 1840 to 1842, a member of the Arkansas House of Representatives from 1842 to 1844, and the fourth Governor of Arkansas from 1849 to 1852.

Mexican War
At the outbreak of the Mexican War, Roane was appointed Lieutenant-Colonel of the Arkansas Mounted Infantry Regiment, succeeding to command when Colonel Archibald Yell was mortally wounded repelling the charge of the Mexican lancers at the Battle of Buena Vista. Roane was officially appointed Colonel on February 28, 1847. He was known to be jealous of the honor of his state and once challenged Albert Pike to a duel over what he perceived as derogatory statements made about the regiment's actions in the war. The duel was fought, but neither combatant was injured.

American Civil War
On March 20, 1862, Roane was appointed to the grade of brigadier-general in the Confederate States Army. After most Confederate troops were moved from Arkansas across the Mississippi River, he was placed in charge of the defense of Arkansas. At this time Arkansas was nearly defenseless; and Roane, with the newly appointed commander of the Trans-Mississippi District (also known as Department Number Two), Major-General Thomas Hindman, cobbled together a reasonable defensive force. Roane took part in numerous battles within the Trans-Mississippi Theater, including the battles of Whitney's Lane and Prairie Grove.

Personal life
On February 1, 1855, Roane married Mary Kim Smith (1833–1907) of Dallas, Arkansas.

Later life
Roane died in Jefferson County, Arkansas, and is buried at Oakland Cemetery, Little Rock.

See also
 List of Arkansas adjutants general
 List of Confederate States Army generals
 List of governors of Arkansas
 List of people from Tennessee

References

External links
 John Selden Roane at the Encyclopedia of Arkansas
 
 John Selden Roane at National Governors Association
 John Selden Roane at The Political Graveyard
 
 
 

1817 births
1867 deaths
19th-century American lawyers
19th-century American politicians
Adjutants General of Arkansas
Arkansas lawyers
American duellists
American lawyers admitted to the practice of law by reading law
American militia officers
American military personnel of the Mexican–American War
American planters
American slave owners
Burials in Pulaski County, Arkansas
Confederate States Army brigadier generals
Cumberland College (Princeton, Kentucky) alumni
Democratic Party governors of Arkansas
Farmers from Arkansas
Neurological disease deaths in Arkansas
People from Wilson County, Tennessee
People of Arkansas in the American Civil War
Recipients of American presidential pardons
Speakers of the Arkansas House of Representatives
Democratic Party members of the Arkansas House of Representatives
United States Army colonels